Basophobia or basiphobia may refer to:

 Basophobia, fear associated with astasia-abasia or fear of walking/standing erect
 Basophobia, fear of falling